Sound Island is an island of the Andaman Islands. It belongs to the North and Middle Andaman administrative district, part of the Indian union territory of Andaman and Nicobar Islands.

History
The island was under the control of Japanese during World War II, and housed a small team of Japanese army personnel whose assignment was to sound and alert the army in Mayabunder of approaching enemy ships by sounding drums and bugles.

Geography
The island belongs to the Stewart Sound Group and lies between Square Island and Goose Island. The island is the biggest of the group, having an area of almost . 
Small Square Island , just at the southern tip, has an automated lighthouse located on it.

Administration
Politically, Sound Island, along neighboring Stewart Sound Group Islands, is divided between Diglipur Taluk and Mayabunder Tehsil.

References 

 Geological Survey of India

Islands of North and Middle Andaman district
Uninhabited islands of India
Islands of India
Islands of the Bay of Bengal